Japanese woman is an 1871 painting by Hungarian artist Bertalan Székely.

Description
Oil on canvas, it is 169.5 x 121.5cm and is in the collection of the Hungarian National Museum in Budapest.

Analysis
Székely a significant artist in 19th century Kingdom of Hungary, also produced a remarkable work in this painting -- for the first time Hungarian art shows the impact of Japonism. Judging by her look and features, the model does not seem to be Japanese, but other items in the work testify to Japanese culture and spirit and give information about them. Szekely encountered Japanese original works and objects during the East Asia exhibition at the Hungarian National Museum in 1870, and the exhibition inspired him to create this picture the following year.

References 

1871 paintings
Hungarian culture
Japonisme